is a private  junior college in Takasaki, Gunma, Japan, established in 1977, and located in Takasaki since 1987. Originally a women's college, it became co-educational from 2010.

External links
 Official website

Japanese junior colleges
Educational institutions established in 1977
Private universities and colleges in Japan
Universities and colleges in Gunma Prefecture
1977 establishments in Japan
Takasaki, Gunma